Aldgate was a gate in the former defensive wall around the City of London. It gives its name to Aldgate High Street, the first stretch of the A11 road, which included the site of the former gate.

The area of Aldgate, the most common use of the term, is focused around the former gate and the High Street and includes part of the city and parts of the London Borough of Tower Hamlets. It is 2.3 miles (3.7 km) east of Charing Cross.

There is also an Aldgate Ward of the City of London. The Ward is of ancient origin, but intramural, so almost entirely distinct from the area around Aldgate High Street, which is mostly outside the line of the London Wall.

Etymology

The etymology of the name "Aldgate" is uncertain. It is first recorded in 1052 as Æst geat ("east gate") but had become Alegate by 1108. Writing in the 16th century, John Stow derived the name from "Old Gate" (Aeld Gate). However, Henry Harben, writing in 1918, contended that this was wrong and that documents show that the "d" is missing in documents written before 1486–87. Alternative meanings include "Ale Gate" in connection with a putative ale-house or "All Gate" meaning the gate was free to all. Other possibilities canvassed by Harben include reference to a Saxon named "Ealh,"  or reference to foreigners ("el") or oil ("ele") or "awl". Gillian Bebbington, writing in 1972, suggests Alegate, Aelgate ("public gate") or Aeldgate ("Old Gate") as equally viable alternatives, while Weinreb and Hibbert, writing in 1983, revert to Stow's theory that the name means "Old Gate".

The gate and its locality

The gate
It is thought that a gate at Aldgate spanned the road to Colchester in the Roman period, when London Wall was constructed. The gateway – which probably had two circular towers –  stood at the corner of the modern Duke's Place, on the east side of the city, with a busy thoroughfare passing through it. It was rebuilt between 1108 and 1147, again in 1215, and reconstructed completely between 1607 and 1609 "in a more classical and less functional style". Like London's other gates, Aldgate was "fortified with porticullises and chained" in 1377 due to concerns about potential attacks by the French. The gate was finally removed in 1761; it was temporarily re-erected at Bethnal Green.

Aldgate did have defensive functions, and, between its early 13th- and early 17th-century reconstructions, was breached on only two occasions. The first occurred during the Great Rising in the summer of 1381 when thousands of insurgents from the surrounding region, assisted by sympathisers within and without, entered the City through Aldgate. The second breach was during the Siege of London, in the spring of 1471, when troops led by the Bastard of Fauconberg forced open the gate. According to Chaucer scholar Paul Strohm, the assault was only successful "by the design of [Aldgate’s] defenders": after a number of Fauconberg's men were allowed to gain entry, the gate's "portcullis was lowered to trap them inside, where they were taken and slain".

While he was a customs official, from 1374 until 1386, Geoffrey Chaucer occupied apartments above the gate, where he wrote some of his poems. London's aldermen had first conceived of renting unneeded space over the City gates earlier in the century. Although keenly sought after due to their location, the rooms "were built for military occupancy and remained rough-hewn [and] nonprivate". Chaucer likely occupied the single tower on the south end of the gate. The space would have been "cramped, cold, rudimentary in its sanitary arrangements, and (perhaps most seriously in the case of a writer) ill lit, even at midday".

In his Survey of London (1598), John Stow wrote that Aldgate "hath had two pair of gates, though now but one; the hooks remaineth yet. Also there hath been two portcullisses; the one of them remaineth, the other wanteth, but the place of letting down is manifest".

Aldgate locality

Geography
Aldgate High Street begins at Aldgate Pump, on the junction of Leadenhall Street and Fenchurch Street. This  of street includes a tiny part of the intramural Aldgate Ward, a part of the extramural Portsoken Ward and part of the Whitechapel district of the London Borough of Tower Hamlets. The road junction at Aldgate East station (the junction of Whitechapel High Street, Commercial Street and Leman Street) is still occasionally referred to as "Gardiners' Corner", in honour of a long-disappeared department store.

History
The Augustinians priory of Holy Trinity Aldgate was founded by Matilda, the wife of King Henry I, in 1108, on ground just inside the gate.

In about 1420 the Whitechapel Bell Foundry was founded in Aldgate, but it later moved to nearby Whitechapel. The foundry continued to supply bells to churches in the city, including the rebuilt church of St Botolph without Aldgate in 1744.

During the late 16th-century, an immigrant from Antwerp named Jacob Jansen (d. 1593) established a pottery producing English Delftware at Aldgate.

A Jewish community developed in the area after Oliver Cromwell invited the Jews to return to England. They established London's oldest synagogue at Bevis Marks in 1698,

Aldgate was the centre of the sugar refining industry during the 18th century. It was mainly carried out by German immigrants and their descendants. The oldest surviving German-built church (founded 1762–63) in the UK, the church of St. George, is located at 55 Alie Street.

In 1773 Poems on Various Subjects, Religious and Moral by Phillis Wheatley, the first book by an African American was published in Aldgate after her owners could not find a publisher in Boston, Massachusetts.

Daniel Mendoza was born in 1764 to a Jewish family in Aldgate. He was author of The Art of Boxing and became an English boxing champion from 1792 to 1795.

Aldgate Pump

From 1700 distances into Essex and Middlesex were measured from Aldgate Pump. The original pump was taken down in 1876, and a "faux" pump and drinking fountain was erected several yards to the west of the original; it was supplied by water from the New River.

In ancient deeds, Alegate Well is mentioned, adjoining the City wall, and this may have been the source (of water) for the original pump. A section of the remains of Holy Trinity Priory can be seen through a window in a nearby office block, on the north side.

Aldgate Square

In the 1970s, the historic street pattern in central Aldgate was altered to form one large traffic gyratory at the junction which included Whitechapel High Street and Commercial Road. This was followed by office development on the traffic island at the centre, and a network of underground subways was constructed to provide pedestrian access beneath the one-way system and to provide a link to the London Underground stations. This led to parts of Aldgate being protected in the Whitechapel High Street Conservation Area and there are numerous listed buildings.

Aldgate Square, a new public square sited between two heritage listed buildings, The Aldgate School and the church of St Botolph without Aldgate, was opened on 15 June 2018 by the Lord Mayor of the City of London. The cafe on the square, Portsoken Pavilion (named after the extramural Portsoken ward), was designed by Make, architects of the award-winning Visitor Information Centre at St Paul's Cathedral.

The line of the former London Wall runs along the western side of the Square, with the road Aldgate to the south-west passing through the site of the gate.

Public artworks
Notable sculptures in Aldgate are the bronze abstract "Ridirich" (1980) by Keith McCarter in the Square between Little Somerset Street and the bus garage on Aldgate High Street; "Sanctuary" (1985) outside the church of St Botolph without Aldgate made of fibreglass by Naomi Blake; "Column" (1995) caste in bronze by Richard Perry marking the entrance to Petticoat Lane Market at the southern end of Middlesex Street; and six hurtling bronze horses (2015) by Hamish Mackie in the piazza at Goodman's Fields.

Archaeological finds
In 2013 in Minories, Aldgate – on the last day of excavations – archaeologists found a 1,900-year-old Roman sculpture from the late 1st or early 2nd century AD in what was Roman London's "Eastern Cemetery". "The Minories Eagle", hailed by experts as one of the rarest and finest artefacts ever unearthed in Britain would have stood in a niche in a mausoleum above the tomb of a very powerful and wealthy man. Carved in Cotswold oolitic stone and rich in iconography it shows an exquisitely carved and outstandingly preserved eagle with a serpent in its beak. It was exhibited at the Museum of London in October 2013.

Ward of Aldgate
Aldgate is one of 25 wards in the City of London, each electing an Alderman to the Court of Aldermen and Commoners (the City equivalent of a councillor) to the Court of Common Council of the City of London Corporation. Only electors who are Freemen of the City are eligible to stand.

The Wards of London appear to have taken shape in the 11th century, before the Norman Conquest. Their administrative, judicial and military purpose made them equivalent to Hundreds in the countryside. The primary purpose of Wards like Aldgate, which included a gate, appears to be the defence of the gate, as gates were the weakest points in any fortification.

The historic City ward is bounded on the east by the line of the former London Wall, effectively parallel with Houndsditch, which separates it from the Portsoken ward; it is bounded on the south by Tower ward and on the west and north by the Langbourn, Lime Street, and Bishopsgate wards.

Since major boundary changes in 2013, the ward is now bounded by White Kennet Street in the north and Crutched Friars in the south, taking in Leadenhall and Fenchurch Streets. It therefore now includes a small area outside the line of the former walls. 

Within Aldgate ward, a short distance to the north of the gate, Jews settled from 1181, until their expulsion in 1290 by King Edward I. The area became known as Old Jewry. Jews were welcomed back by Oliver Cromwell, and once again they settled in the area, founding London's oldest synagogue at Bevis Marks in 1698.

On 10 April 1992 the Provisional IRA detonated a bomb close to the Baltic Exchange, severely damaging the historic building and neighbouring structures. 30 St Mary Axe (formerly the Swiss Re Building) now occupies the site, and the Baltic Exchange is located at 38 St Mary Axe.

The ward today is dominated by the insurance industry, with several brokers and underwriters based there; prominent buildings include the Lloyd's Register building, 30 St Mary Axe, the Willis Building and the London Metal Exchange.

Three churches are located in Aldgate ward: St. Botolph's, St Katharine Cree (1631) and St Andrew Undershaft (1532) – administered from St. Helen's in Lime Street ward.

The Bevis Marks Synagogue (1699), the oldest in the United Kingdom, is also located in the ward, on Bevis Marks. John Cass's school, where a plaque records the former course of London Wall, is sited on the north side of Aldgate (the street).

The nearest London Underground station is Aldgate on the Circle and Metropolitan lines;  nearby   is served today by the District and Hammersmith & City lines. Nearby mainline railway stations are located at Liverpool Street and Fenchurch Street, and Tower Gateway is the closest Docklands Light Railway station.

See also

Aldersgate
City gate
City wall
Battle of Cable Street
Stepney Historical Trust

References

External links
City of London Corporation Map of Aldgate ward (2003 —)
Aldgate Ward Elected Members
Aldgate Ward Club
Map of Early Modern London:  Aldgate Ward – Historical Map and Encyclopedia of Shakespeare's London (Scholarly)

 
London Wall and its gates
Streets in the City of London
Town Gates in England
Wards of the City of London